Tatyana Sergeevna Danilyants (born 1971) is a Russian film director, photographer and poet.

She is of Armenian descent. She studied in Moscow, then at the Peggy Guggenheim Collection in Venice, Italy. In 1997 she attended courses by Andrzej Wajda.

She was awarded the Italian Nosside poetry prize in 2008. In 2011 she exhibited her project Anima Russa ("Russian Soul"), consisting of photos and glass sculptures, at the contemporary art gallery of Venice Projects, in Venice.

References

External links
 Центр современного искусства (Москва) — Татьяна Данильянц «Traffic Jam»
 Татьяна Данильянц
 http://magazines.russ.ru/authors/d/danilyants/

Russian women poets
Living people
Russian women film directors
Russian photographers
Russian women photographers
1969 births